Frederick John Shirley Tanner  (28 April 1889 – 3 March 1965) was a British trade unionist.

Born in Whitstable, Tanner grew up in London and became a fitter and turner at the age of 14. He joined the Social Democratic Federation and the Amalgamated Society of Engineers, soon becoming a prominent activist, and helping found the National Federation of Women Workers. During the 1910s, he was a leading syndicalist, active in the Industrial Syndicalist Education League, and jointly chaired the First International Syndicalist Congress.

During World War I, Tanner worked as an engineer in France and was active in the then-syndicalist Confédération Générale du Travail. He returned to London in 1917 and became active in the Shop Stewards' Movement, and in 1920 along with others such as John S. Clarke, Helen Crawfurd, Williie Gallacher, Wlliam McLaine, JT Murphy, Sylvia Pankhurst, Tom Quelch, Dave Ramsay and Marjory Newbold, attended the Second Congress of the Communist International. He did join the Communist Party of Great Britain but left after only eight months, though he remained close to colleagues who stayed in the party.

Tanner increasingly devoted his time to the trade union movement, and was elected President of the Amalgamated Engineering Union in 1939, serving until 1953 and promoting economic planning in the engineering industry. Increasingly associated with the right-wing of the union, he served as President of the Trades Union Congress in 1954, and supported the anti-communist Industrial and Research Information Services from 1956.

References

1889 births
1965 deaths
Communist Party of Great Britain members
Presidents of the Amalgamated Engineering Union
Members of the General Confederation of Labour (France)
People from Whitstable
Presidents of the Trades Union Congress
Social Democratic Federation members
British syndicalists